Ksenija Pajić (born 30 June 1961) is a Croatian actress. She appeared in more than fifty films since 1985.

Selected filmography

References

External links 

1961 births
Living people
Actors from Rijeka
Croatian film actresses
20th-century Croatian actresses
21st-century Croatian actresses
Croatian television actresses
Yugoslav film actresses
Yugoslav television actresses